South Hams was a county constituency based on the South Hams district of Devon.  It returned one Member of Parliament (MP)  to the House of Commons of the Parliament of the United Kingdom. The constituency was created for the 1983 general election, and abolished for the 1997 general election. The constituency covered a vast part of the English Riviera on the south Devon coast.

History
This was a safe seat for the Conservative Party. During the fourteen years and three parliaments of its existence, it was held by a single member, Anthony Steen.

In the 1987 general election the well-known Labour MP and staunch republican Willie Hamilton contested the seat, finishing third.

Boundaries
The District of South Hams wards of Avon and Harbourne, Avonleigh, Bickleigh and Shaugh, Brixton, Charterlands, Cornwood and Harford, Dart Valley, Dartington, Dartmouth Clifton, Dartmouth Hardness, Erme Valley, Garabrook, Ivybridge, Kingsbridge, Kingswear, Malborough, Marldon, Modbury, Newton and Noss, Salcombe, Saltstone, Skerries, South Brent, Sparkwell, Stoke Gabriel, Stokenham, Thurlestone, Totnes, Totnes Bridgetown, Ugborough, West Dart, Wembury, and Yealmpton, and the Borough of Torbay wards of Blatchcombe, Furzeham with Churston, and St Peter's with St Mary's.

The main towns of this South Devon constituency were Totnes and Ivybridge. It was divided in 1997 to form parts of the new constituencies of Totnes and Devon South West.

Members of Parliament

Elections

See also
List of parliamentary constituencies in Devon

Notes and references

Parliamentary constituencies in Devon (historic)
Constituencies of the Parliament of the United Kingdom established in 1983
Constituencies of the Parliament of the United Kingdom disestablished in 1997